Siddhartha is a 1972 Indo-American drama mystery film based on the 1922  novel of the same name by Hermann Hesse, directed by Conrad Rooks. It was shot on location in Northern India, and features work by noted cinematographer Sven Nykvist. The locations used for the film were the holy city of Rishikesh and the private estates and palaces of the Maharajah of Bharatpur.

Plot
The film tells the story of the young Siddhartha (played by Shashi Kapoor), born in a rich family, and his search for a meaningful way of life. This search takes him through periods of harsh asceticism, sensual pleasures, material wealth, then self-revulsion and eventually to the oneness and harmony with himself that he has been seeking. Siddhartha learns that the secret of life cannot be passed on from one person to another, but must be achieved through inner experience.

Cast
 Shashi Kapoor as Siddhartha
 Simi Garewal as Kamala
 Romesh Sharma as Govinda
 Pincho Kapoor as Kamaswami
 Zul Vellani as Vasudeva
 Amrik Singh as Father
 Kunal Kapoor as Son
 Shanti Hiranand as Mother

Controversy
Simi Garewal's nude scene caused controversy in India. The Indian Censor Board, at that time, did not even permit on-screen kissing in Indian films.

Music
All the Indian music was composed and sung by Hemant Kumar, with lyrics to the songs by Gouriprasanna: Mother's song was by Shanti Hiranand.

Kumar's Bengali songs, adapted for Siddhartha, "Pather Klanti Bhule" is from the 1956 movie Maru Tirtha Hinglaj and "O Nodire Ekti Kotha Shudhai" is from the 1959 movie Neel Akasher Neechey.

No soundtrack album for the film was issued.

Premiere and revival
The film premiered in the West and the U.S. to positive reviews. Then during the 1970s and 1980s, it disappeared from distribution and runs in theaters. In 1996 it came back after much work and restoration, followed by release to TV and video. Those who saw the film applauded it as a tale of self-discovery and praised the restoration work. A region 1 DVD was released in 2002.

See also
List of historical drama films of Asia

References

External links
 

1973 films
Films about Gautama Buddha
Films based on Swiss novels
Films set in ancient India
Films shot in Rajasthan
Films shot in Uttarakhand
Buddhism in fiction
Metaphysical fiction films
1970s erotic drama films
Films scored by Hemant Kumar
American erotic drama films
Columbia Pictures films
Adaptations of works by Hermann Hesse
Films directed by Conrad Rooks
Films with screenplays by Paul Mayersberg
Obscenity controversies in film
1973 drama films
Films about courtesans in India
1970s English-language films
1970s American films